The 2019 West Virginia Mountaineers football team represented West Virginia University during the 2019 NCAA Division I FBS football season. The Mountaineers played their home games at the Mountaineer Field at Milan Puskar Stadium, in Morgantown, West Virginia, and competed in the Big 12 Conference. They were led by first-year head coach Neal Brown, who previously coached at Troy University. They finished the season 5–7, 3–6 in Big 12 play to finish in a tie for seventh place.

Previous season
The Mountaineers finished the 2018 season 8–3, 6–3 in Big 12 play to finish in a tie for fourth place. They were invited to the Camping World Bowl where they lost to Syracuse.

Preseason

Big 12 media poll
The 2019 Big 12 media days were held July 15–16, 2019 in Frisco, Texas. In the Big 12 preseason media poll, West Virginia was predicted to finish in eighth in the standings.

Preseason All-Big 12 teams
To be released

Schedule

Personnel

Coaching staff
 Head coach
Neal Brown

Assistant coaches

Jahmile Addae– Defensive Backs

Xavier Dye – Wide Receivers

Vic Koenning – Defensive Coordinator

Jordan Lesley – Defensive Line

Matt Moore – Co-Offensive Coordinator, Offensive Line

Al Pogue – Outside Linebackers

Sean Reagan – Quarterbacks

Chad Scott – Co-Offensive Coordinator, Running Backs

Blake Seiler – Inside Linebackers

Travis Trickett – Tight Ends, Inside Receivers

Game summaries

James Madison

at Missouri

NC State

at Kansas

West Virginia was expected to take advantage of observing the Jayhawks offensive performance the prior week where Kansas had beaten Boston College.  When the game rolled around, the Jayhawk offense made two specific mistakes that impacted the game:  A lost fumble and a fourth quarter interception.  Kansas averaged 7.4 yards per play on offense.  It also appeared that KU kicker Liam Jones faked an injury after a field goal to make way for Jacob Borcila to "replace" him at the next kickoff to execute an onside kick—which they recovered but then lost due to a penalty.  West Virginia won the game 29-24.

Texas

Iowa State

at Oklahoma

at Baylor

Texas Tech

at Kansas State

West Virginia's Jarret Doege started at quarterback and threw for 234 yards and three touchdowns.  This was the first start at West Virginia for Doege who transferred from Bowling Green, as Austin Kendall had been the starting quarterback all season for the Mountaineers.  Doege's biggest throw was a 50-yard touchdown pass on third-and-22 in the fourth quarter to take the lead.

Kansas State started strong, holding West Virginia to "three-and-out" and then Skylar Thompson threw a 68-yard touchdown pass on their first play from scrimmage.  Thompson ended up 24 of 39 for 299 yards passing with a touchdown but also gave up two interceptions.  On the ground, the Wildcats ran the ball 32 times but averaged only 3.2 yards per attempt.

West Virginia cornerback Hakeem Bailey intercepted Skylar Thompson’s pass toward the end zone in the closing seconds of the game.  The Mountaineers left Manhattan with a 24-20 upset of the Wildcats.

Oklahoma State

at TCU

Players drafted into the NFL

References

West Virginia
West Virginia Mountaineers football seasons
West Virginia Mountaineers football